George England and Co. was an early English manufacturer of steam locomotives founded by the engineer George England of Newcastle upon Tyne (1811–1878). The company operated from the Hatcham Iron Works in New Cross, Surrey, and began building locomotives in 1848.

The company supplied one of the earliest tank locomotives to the contractors building the Newhaven, Sussex, branch line for the London Brighton and South Coast Railway and exhibited a design at The Great Exhibition in 1851. It also supplied locomotives to the Ffestiniog Railway, the Wantage Tramway, the Caledonian Railway, the London & Blackwall Railway, the Great Western Railway, the Somerset and Dorset Railway and the Victorian Railways amongst others.

Locomotive types

Festiniog Railway 0-4-0
The four locomotives supplied by England, in 1863/64, to the Festiniog Railway, were the first truly successful narrow gauge  engines built. Remarkably three of the four survive, much rebuilt, two still in full working order. The other, Princess, was for many years on display at Spooner's Bar in Porthmadog, although without its tender. It has since been restored cosmetically to a high standard, and has made appearances in London and elsewhere for publicity purposes.

Two more similar  engines, to an improved design, were built in 1867, one of which, Welsh Pony, survives, and bought back to steam on the 27th of June 2020. Having undergone a careful and sympathetic restoration by the Ffestiniog Railway.

Fairlie
In 1869, England built the famous Little Wonder, Fairlies Patent articulated locomotive, also for the Ffestiniog Railway.  George England's daughter, Eliza Anne, had earlier eloped with Robert Francis Fairlie, the inventor of the Fairlie locomotive. On George England's early retirement in 1869, Fairlie took over the company, in partnership with England's son George England junior, renaming it the Fairlie Engine and Steam Carriage Company, but following the death of George England Jr., in July 1870, the works were sold.

Victorian Railways 'Old' V class
Victorian Railways 'Old' V class

Preservation
 Wantage Tramway, Shannon, 0-4-0WT, preserved at Didcot Railway Centre
 Ffestiniog Railway, see: Ffestiniog Railway rolling stock

Notes and references

England
Ffestiniog Railway